The gold stater (Egyptian: nfr-nb, "Nefer-nub", meaning "fine gold") was the first coin ever minted in ancient Egypt, around 360 BC during the reign of pharaoh Teos of the 30th Dynasty.

Under Teos
Teos introduced the gold stater in order to pay salaries of Greek mercenaries who were at his service.
Gold stater with the same weight of a Persian daric (around 8.42 grams), with an owl on the left, modelled after the Athenian model, and a papyrus on the right.
Gold stater as a tetradrachm, with an owl on the left and an olive branch on the right, with the Demotic writing "Teos... Pharaoh".

Under Nectanebo II
Teos' successor Nectanebo II kept this practice, though coining his personal gold staters.
Gold stater as a daric (about 8.42 grams), obverse with a prancing horse on the right, reverse with the hieroglyphs nfr-nb.
Small gold stater (about 2.56 grams, diameter 14-15 mm), with a probable picture of a leaping gazelle. Its attribution to Nectanebo II, however, is not confirmed.

See also

Ptolemaic coinage

Sources

Ernst Gölitzer, Entstehung und Entwicklung des alexandrinischen Münzwesens von 30 v. Chr. bis zum Ende der julisch-claudischen Dynastie. Akademie-Verlag, Berlin 2004, p. 6.

External links
 Gold stater/daric of Nectanebo II

Currencies of Africa
Gold coins
Currencies of ancient Africa
Economic history of Egypt
Thirtieth Dynasty of Egypt